"Moving Spirit" is a science fiction short story by British writer Arthur C. Clarke, first published in 1957. The story within a comic story is narrated by Harry Purvis, who is called to assist a scientist relative of his in a trial. The scientist has been brought before the local magistrate's court on charges of illegally distilling liquor. Purvis manages to get him acquitted, by arguing that he was actually working on a fictional "osmotic bomb". Unfortunately Purvis accidentally demonstrates this bomb by exploding it in the courtroom, thus conveniently destroying all the evidence. However, the scientist is almost immediately booked for driving under the influence due to the strong smell of alcohol from his wet clothes.

The piece is one of two original stories written for Clarke's collection Tales from the White Hart, the other being "The Defenestration of Ermintrude Inch."

References

External links 
 

Short stories by Arthur C. Clarke
1957 short stories
Tales from the White Hart